Easton Neston is situated in south Northamptonshire, England. Though the village of Easton Neston which was inhabited until around 1500 is now gone, the parish retains the name. At the 2011 Census the population of the civil parish remained less than 100 and was included in the town of Towcester.

The villages name means 'Eadstan's farm/settlement' or 'Aethelstan's farm/settlement'.

The ecclesiastical parish of Easton Neston is much larger, with a population of approximately 1200.

Location
The parish is adjacent to the north-east side of Towcester. Showsley can be accessed by a left turn off the A43 road between Northampton and Towcester about half a mile south of the Tiffield and Blisworth junctions. Alternatively, it can be approached in the other direction from Shutlanger. Hulcote can be accessed by the second left turn of the A43 past the turn for Showsley. This turn follows the route of the old A43 prior to the construction of the Towcester by-pass. The old route itself was built west of the old road which followed the line of the "Old Road Spinney" marked on Ordnance Survey maps. Immediately after turning make a sharp left turn towards Hulcote which is about half a mile at the end of a cul-de-sac. The Easton Neston House and Estate are private property and may be periodically open to the public.

Buildings

Estate
Easton Neston House was built for Sir William Fermor (later Lord Leominster ("Lem-ster")) in 1685-1695 and remodelled by Nicholas Hawksmoor, 1700-1702. It was built on the site of Easton Nestone village, the main Oxford to Northampton road being re-routed to the west. The grounds also have 18th century Stables and a Temple dated 1641. There are Entrance Lodges on the old Towcester Road north-west and south-west of the house of about 1822. There is a public footpath which runs from the north-west lodge east to Hulcote.

The Parish Church of St Mary is on the south side of Easton Neston estate and in the Church of England's Diocese of Peterborough. Its origins are 13th century and it has box pews. There are several monuments to the Fermor-Hesketh family from the main house including Sir Richard Fermor (d.1552).

Visitors to St Mary's are welcome on occasional Heritage Open Days.

In January 2011, the BBC were due to record a service from the church as part of a documentary on Easton Neston.

Towcester Racecourse is in the southern part of the estate.

Showsley
In Showsley there are the remains of a 12th-century Cistercian Priory (known as Sewardsley Priory). The area was explored by Channel 4's archaeological television programme Time Team in 2007 and the episode about the dig first screened on 27 January 2008. This can be viewed on the Time Team Channel on YouTube, the episode is called “The Naughty Nuns of Northamptonshire”. The dig found the priory church, about 90 feet by 20 feet in size; and the cloister, measuring about 45 feet square. There were some striking floor tiles decorated with images of a dog and others with a flower; and large amounts of pottery. The team also looked at what was thought to have been an antiquarian garden feature. This was found to be actually graves, complete with the remains of the people who had been buried there. Two were of particular interest. These had not been cut together but were finished off together, suggesting that their occupants were connected in some way.

Railway
Part of the trackbed of the dismantled Stratford-upon-Avon and Midland Junction Railway (SMJR) runs east to west between Showsley and north of Hulcote towards the site of Towcester Station, now the site of a Tesco supermarket. The line ran from Towcester to Stoke Bruerne, then east, crossing over the West Coast Main Line and then into Bedfordshire. The line was opened in 1891 and it joined the line from Blisworth to Towcester just north of what is now the roundabout at the junction of the A5 and A43 near Towcester.

Former industries 
The parish was not always as agricultural as it now appears. Quarries for either iron ore or limestone existed in the 1870s in the vicinity of Showsley and Shutlanger. The quarries were obviously small and it is not clear where they were. The stone was taken away by horse and cart. A larger iron ore operation began north of Hulcote in 1873. A branch railway was constructed to take the ore away. This joined the line from Blisworth to Towcester south of Tiffield. The junction faced Blisworth. An ironworks was constructed at the junction which smelted the Hulcote ore between 1875 and 1882 when the works closed. The quarries at Hulcote operated with short breaks until 1920.

The first Hulcote iron ore quarries were on the east side of the Northampton to Towcester road on both sides of the minor road to Showsley. A clay pit was dug close by on the west side of the main road and a brick works built next to it to make bricks from the clay. Sidings were installed on the railway branch to serve the works. The brickworks and claypit operated until about 1900.

In 1891 when the S and MJR was built next to the quarries and brickworks (see above) the existing branch railway was made redundant and the ore and bricks were taken away by the new line. The new junction at Towcester faced towards Towcester and Banbury and the junction at Olney faced Bedford. A new iron ore quarry was started on the west side of the main road to the north of the old claypit in about 1908 which was in use until the other Hulcote quarries closed in 1920. A separate iron ore quarry operated close to Round Spinney at Showsley close to the S and MJR. It was there by 1909 and closed some time between 1913 and 1920.

The quarrying was done by hand (with the assistance of explosives in the westernmost iron quarry) but from 1914 two steam machines were used to strip the overburden in that western quarry. Short narrow gauge tramways connected the claypit to the brickworks and the iron ore quarries to the railway sidings. The tramways were operated by horses (and from 1908 by steam locomotives)

The claypit is still there. It is filled with water. There are remains of the quarrying and the tramways and railways although some of the quarried area has been restored for farming and some remains have been obliterated by the widening and diversion of the A43. Some of the remains are hidden by trees. The remains of a bridge under which a tramway ran can be seen on the minor road to Showsley where the road turns sharply to the left (travelling eastwards)

See also
List of monastic houses in Northamptonshire

References

Villages in Northamptonshire
History of Northamptonshire
Tourist attractions in Northamptonshire
West Northamptonshire District
Civil parishes in Northamptonshire